Yelena Nikolaevna Romanova (20 March 1963 – 28 January 2007) was a Russian distance runner. She won an Olympic gold medal in 1992.

She was found dead of unknown causes at age 43 in her flat in Volgograd. At the time of her death she was employed as athletics coach at a local sports school and also worked with members of the Russian athletic team.

International competitions

See also
List of Olympic medalists in athletics (women)
List of 1992 Summer Olympics medal winners
List of World Athletics Championships medalists (women)
List of European Athletics Championships medalists (women)
List of Russian sportspeople
5000 metres at the Olympics
5000 metres at the World Championships in Athletics

References

External links 

1963 births
2007 deaths
Sportspeople from Voronezh
Soviet female middle-distance runners
Russian female middle-distance runners
Soviet female long-distance runners
Russian female long-distance runners
Soviet female cross country runners
Russian female cross country runners
Olympic female middle-distance runners
Olympic athletes of the Soviet Union
Olympic athletes of the Unified Team
Olympic athletes of Russia
Olympic gold medalists for the Unified Team
Olympic gold medalists in athletics (track and field)
Athletes (track and field) at the 1988 Summer Olympics
Athletes (track and field) at the 1992 Summer Olympics
Athletes (track and field) at the 1996 Summer Olympics
Medalists at the 1992 Summer Olympics
Goodwill Games medalists in athletics
Competitors at the 1990 Goodwill Games
Competitors at the 1994 Goodwill Games
World Athletics Championships athletes for the Soviet Union
World Athletics Championships athletes for Russia
World Athletics Championships medalists
European Athletics Championships winners
European Athletics Championships medalists
Russian Athletics Championships winners
Universiade medalists in athletics (track and field)
Universiade silver medalists for the Soviet Union